Milan Kvocera (born 1 January 1998) is a Slovak professional footballer who plays for Wisła Płock as a winger.

Club career

AS Trenčín
Kvocera made his Fortuna Liga debut for AS Trenčín against Slovan Bratislava on 24 September 2016. Kvocera came on in the 46th minute, replacing Aliko Bala. Trenčín won the game 2:1.

Wisła Płock
After training with the team for over three weeks, on 14 July 2022 Kvocera joined Ekstraklasa side Wisła Płock on a one-year contract.

References

External links
 AS Trenčín official club profile
 
 Futbalnet profile
 Fortuna Liga profile

1998 births
Living people
Sportspeople from Považská Bystrica
Slovak footballers
Slovak expatriate footballers
Slovakia youth international footballers
Slovakia under-21 international footballers
Association football forwards
AS Trenčín players
MFK Zemplín Michalovce players
Radomiak Radom players
FK Dukla Banská Bystrica players
Wisła Płock players
Slovak Super Liga players
Ekstraklasa players
I liga players
2. Liga (Slovakia) players
Expatriate footballers in Poland
Slovak expatriate sportspeople in Poland